Brouria Feldman-Muhsam (18 December 1916 – 2008) was an Israeli medical entomologist and parasitologist known for her pioneering work with mites and ticks.  After earning her Teaching Certificate at Levinsky College of Education in Tel-Aviv in 1935, Feldman-Muhsam enrolled in the University of Geneva in Switzerland and completed her Licence ès Sciences in biology there in 1937, qualifying her for doctoral studies. She returned to Mandate Palestine in 1937 and earned her Doctor of Philosophy degree in Medical Entomology at the Hebrew University of Jerusalem, graduating in 1942.

Career
After completing her Ph.D., Feldman-Muhsam worked as a research associate in the cancer research laboratory of the Hebrew University Medical School from 1942-1944.  In 1944 she became a research associate in the Department of Parasitology at Hebrew University Medical School, and from 1961-1969 she was a senior lecturer there.< In 1968 she was appointed an associate professor and named head of the Department of Medical Entomology of Hebrew University of Jerusalem, and was promoted to full professor in 1976.

During her career, Feldman-Muhsam contributed over 100 articles to scientific journals including the Journal of Parasitology, Science, Nature, and other refereed journals, and photographed and produced science films on tick copulation and the movement of sperm in ticks. She is perhaps best known for her research on the physiology and ecology of ticks, particularly in defining the function of the areae porosae, and delineating the processes of tick copulation and reproduction.  Her lifelong acarological collection is preserved in the Medical Parasitology Collection of the Hebrew University of Jerusalem.

Personal life and death
Brouria Feldman was born on 18 December 1916 in Jerusalem, a daughter of Uria and Hanna (née Weinshenker) Feldman. She married in 1937 Helmut V. Muhsam, whom she met at the University of Geneva. Following his graduation with a doctorate in physics in 1937, they moved to Israel where he was on the faculty of Hebrew University.

Feldman-Muhsam died in Jerusalem in 2008.

Honors
Feldman-Muhsam was selected the Helen Marr Kirbey Fellow of the International Association of University Women, in 1944; recipient of the Henrietta Szold prize, Municipality of Tel-Aviv, in 1955; recipient of a research grant awarded by the United States Public Health Service, National Institutes of Health, in 1955; election as a Fellow of the Royal Society of Tropical Medicine; and election to be president of the Israel Society of Parasitology 1983-1988.

Acari described by Feldman-Muhsam
Feldman-Muhsam was the first to describe following species of Acari.

Haemaphysalis adleri Feldman-Muhsam, 1951

Haemaphysalis erinacei Feldman-Muhsam, 1951, currently a synonym of Haemaphysalis erinacei Pavesi, 1884

Rhipicephalus gertrudae Feldman-Muhsam, 1960

Rhipicephalus secundus Feldman-Muhsam, 1952, currently a synonym of Rhipicephalus turanicus Pomerantsev, 1936

Podapolipus coccinellae Feldman-Muhsam and Havivi, 1972

Podapolipus peruvensis Feldman-Muhsam and Havivi, 1974

Podapolipus tribolii Feldman-Muhsam and Havivi, 1972

Adlerocystis ornithodori Feldman-Muhsam and Havivi, 1963

Adlerocystis parkeri Feldman-Muhsam and Havivi, 1963

Nuttallia adleri Feldman-Muhsam, 1962, currently a synonym of Babesia merionis (Rousselot, 1953)

Acari named in her honor
Haemaphysalis muhsamae Santos Dias, 1954

Rhipicephalus muhsamae Morel & Vassiliades, 1965

Eutrombidium feldmanmuhsamae Feider, 1977

Kurosapolipus feldmanmuhsamae Husband and Li, 1993

References

1916 births
2008 deaths
University of Geneva alumni
Hebrew University of Jerusalem alumni
Israeli entomologists
Women entomologists
Women parasitologists
20th-century women scientists
People from Tel Aviv
People from Jerusalem